Cecilie Drabsch Norland (born 10 November 1978) is a retired Norwegian Paralympic swimmer who competed in international level events. She was Norway's first gold medallist in swimming and was the flag bearer for Norway at the 2008 Summer Paralympics.

References

1978 births
Living people
Sportspeople from Stavanger
Paralympic swimmers of Norway
Swimmers at the 2000 Summer Paralympics
Swimmers at the 2004 Summer Paralympics
Swimmers at the 2008 Summer Paralympics
Medalists at the 2004 Summer Paralympics
Medalists at the 2008 Summer Paralympics
Medalists at the World Para Swimming Championships
Norwegian female freestyle swimmers
S8-classified Paralympic swimmers
21st-century Norwegian women